Woolfardisworthy or Woolsery is the name shared by two villages in the county of Devon, England:

Woolfardisworthy, Mid Devon, between Tiverton and Crediton (Mid Devon)
Woolfardisworthy, Torridge, near Clovelly and Bideford (North Devon)